Juan Domingo Roldán (6 March 1957 – 18 November 2020) was an Argentine professional boxer, best remembered for his strong showing in the early rounds of an undisputed world championship bout against Marvelous Marvin Hagler. After flooring Hagler in the opening seconds Roldan was able to further enjoy success against the dominant middleweight champion. Hagler significantly injured Roldán's eye. 
Roldán fought on, but was unable to continue and suffered a technical knockout. He retired for a couple of years before coming back with a campaign that took him to another middleweight world title bout, this time with Thomas Hearns. In an exciting contest, Roldán shook Hearns early, but succumbed to a Hearns attack in the fourth. A final world middleweight title fight with Michael Nunn resulted in a loss by KO, following which Roldán ended his professional boxing career. Nicknamed Martillo (Hammer) Roldán often featured on Ring En Español magazine.

Career

Roldán made his professional debut on December 8, 1978 in San Francisco, Argentina, defeating Jorge Servin via first-round knockout. His first four wins all came by first round knockouts. On May 11, 1979, Roldán went the distance for the first time when rival Hugo Obregón went ten rounds with him. Roldán won the fight on points. On September 21, 1979, he suffered the first defeat of his career to Juan Carlos Borgado, losing a ten-round decision.

Out of his next eighteen bouts, he won seventeen and drew (tied) once. He then challenged Jacinto Fernández on March 13, 1981, for the Argentine Middleweight title, winning a twelve-round decision. In his next fight, he beat José María Flores Burlón, a boxer who would later challenge Carlos De León for the world's Cruiserweight title. Roldán won six more fights and drew one before challenging José Maria's brother, Carlos Flores Burlón for the South American Middleweight title, on February 12, 1982. He won the title with a second-round knockout.

Before 1982 was over, he retained his Argentine Middleweight title with a first-round knockout of Marcos Perez, but losing on a disqualification in three rounds to Ricardo Arce. In an immediate rematch, Roldán put his Argentine title on the line and this time, he avenged his defeat to Arce with a second-round knockout win. After five more wins in a row, he fought Juan Carlos Peralta, with the fight resulting in a three-round no contest.

On May 27, 1983, Roldán made his international debut, with a 10-round decision over Teddy Mann in Rhode Island, United States. After retaining his Argentine title twice more, he was faced, on November 10, 1983, with one of the top rated Middleweights of the time, Frank 'The Animal' Fletcher, at the undercard of the high-profile, Marvin Hagler vs. Roberto Durán world title fight in Las Vegas. Roldán dropped Fletcher twice on his way to a sixth-round knockout victory.

After this win, Roldán was ranked number 1 by the major boxing organizations, and he accordingly met Hagler for the undisputed world middleweight title on March 30, 1984. Seconds into round one, the quick starting Roldán became the first and only boxer to score an official knockdown against Hagler, who though not hurt was disconcerted. In round three, Hagler was credited with a knockdown which was also dubious, after Roldán had got his feet tangled with the ring's ropes. Roldán showed less recklessness than previously in this contest, and utilizing his innate hand speed and a style difficult for southpaws to defend against, he landed scoring punches for the next few rounds while pressing the action. Though not rocking Hagler, they were considered surprising by commentators in view of his skills and Roldán's crude technique. However, by the middle of the bout, Hagler was winning every exchange. After being floored in the tenth, a swollen and cut Roldán quit, giving Hagler a win by technical knockout. The October after this bruising loss, Roldán announced his retirement. His knockdown of Hagler signaled the beginning of a renowned champion's decline, but none of the diminished Hagler's subsequent opponents were able to duplicate Roldán's feat which remained unique.

In 1986, Roldán reconsidered his decision and made a comeback. He won thirteen bouts in a row, including one over James Kinchen, before he challenged for a world title again. On October 29, 1987, at Las Vegas, Thomas Hearns became the first boxer to win world titles in four different divisions when he beat Roldán in four rounds by knockout, but not before Roldán had Hearns in trouble in rounds three and four.

On September 16, 1988, Roldán beat former world Middleweight champion Hugo Corro via first-round knockout in Mar del Plata, securing a third world title shot, against Michael Nunn on November 4 of that year. Roldán lost what turned out to be his last fight, by a knockout in round eight. Roldán retired with a record of 67 wins, 5 losses, 2 draws and one no contest, 47 of his wins being by knockout.

Death
Roldán died on November 18, 2020, from COVID-19 during the COVID-19 pandemic in Argentina. He was 63.

Professional boxing record

|-
|align="center" colspan=8|67 Wins (47 knockouts, 20 decisions), 5 Losses (4 knockouts, 1 decision), 2 Draws, 1 No Contest 
|-
| align="center" style="border-style: none none solid solid; background: #e3e3e3"|Res.
| align="center" style="border-style: none none solid solid; background: #e3e3e3"|Record
| align="center" style="border-style: none none solid solid; background: #e3e3e3"|Opponent
| align="center" style="border-style: none none solid solid; background: #e3e3e3"|Type
| align="center" style="border-style: none none solid solid; background: #e3e3e3"|Round
| align="center" style="border-style: none none solid solid; background: #e3e3e3"|Date
| align="center" style="border-style: none none solid solid; background: #e3e3e3"|Location
| align="center" style="border-style: none none solid solid; background: #e3e3e3"|Notes
|-align=center
|Loss
|
|align=left| Michael Nunn
|KO
|8
|04/11/1988
|align=left| Las Vegas, Nevada, U.S.
|align=left|
|-
|Win
|
|align=left| Hugo Pastor Corro
|KO
|1
|16/09/1988
|align=left| Buenos Aire, Argentina
|align=left|
|-
|Win
|
|align=left| Miguel Angel Maldonado
|KO
|6
|19/08/1988
|align=left| San Miguel de Tucuman, Argentina
|align=left|
|-
|Loss
|
|align=left| Thomas Hearns
|KO
|4
|29/10/1987
|align=left| Las Vegas, Nevada, U.S.
|align=left|
|-
|Win
|
|align=left| Clarismundo Aparecido Silva
|KO
|2
|15/05/1987
|align=left| Comodoro Rivadavia, Argentina
|align=left|
|-
|Win
|
|align=left| James "The Heat" Kinchen
|TKO
|9
|06/04/1987
|align=left| Las Vegas, Nevada, U.S.
|align=left|
|-
|Win
|
|align=left| Tomas Polo Ruiz
|KO
|4
|06/02/1987
|align=left| Rosario, Santa Fe, Argentina
|align=left|
|-
|Win
|
|align=left| Carlos Maria del Valle Herrera
|KO
|2
|13/12/1986
|align=left| Buenos Aire, Argentina
|align=left|
|-
|Win
|
|align=left| JB Williamson
|PTS
|10
|18/10/1986
|align=left| Buenos Aire, Argentina
|align=left|
|-
|Win
|
|align=left| Juan Carlos Gimenez
|PTS
|10
|13/09/1986
|align=left| Buenos Aire, Argentina
|align=left|
|-
|Win
|
|align=left| Miguel Angel Maldonado
|KO
|2
|29/08/1986
|align=left| Rosario, Santa Fe, Argentina
|align=left|
|-
|Win
|
|align=left| Darryl Penn
|KO
|3
|01/08/1986
|align=left| San Francisco, Cordoba, Argentina
|align=left|
|-
|Win
|
|align=left| Eduardo Domingo Contreras
|PTS
|10
|19/06/1986
|align=left| Cordoba, Argentina
|align=left|
|-
|Win
|
|align=left| Jorge Juan Salgado
|PTS
|10
|10/05/1986
|align=left| Buenos Aire, Argentina
|align=left|
|-
|Win
|
|align=left| Angel Antonio Caro
|KO
|6
|29/03/1986
|align=left| Villa Angela, Argentina
|align=left|
|-
|Win
|
|align=left| Juan Carlos "The King" Fernandez
|KO
|2
|14/02/1986
|align=left| Ceres, Santa Fe, Argentina
|align=left|
|-
|Win
|
|align=left| Andre Mongelema
|PTS
|8
|14/07/1984
|align=left| Monte Carlo, Monaco
|align=left|
|-
|Loss
|
|align=left| Marvelous Marvin Hagler
|TKO
|10
|30/03/1984
|align=left| Las Vegas, Nevada, U.S.
|align=left|
|-
|Win
|
|align=left| Frank "The Animal" Fletcher
|KO
|6
|10/11/1983
|align=left| Las Vegas, Nevada, U.S.
|align=left|
|-
|Win
|
|align=left| Eduardo Domingo Contreras
|PTS
|10
|16/09/1983
|align=left| San Francisco, Cordoba, Argentina
|align=left|
|-
|Win
|
|align=left| Roberto Justino Ruiz
|KO
|8
|06/08/1983
|align=left| Buenos Aire, Argentina
|align=left|
|-
|Win
|
|align=left| Teddy Mann
|UD
|10
|27/05/1983
|align=left| Providence, Rhode Island, U.S.
|align=left|
|-
|Win
|
|align=left| Wilbur Henderson
|KO
|7
|11/02/1983
|align=left| Worcester, Massachusetts, Argentina
|align=left|
|-
|No Contest
|
|align=left| Juan Carlos Peralta
|NC
|3
|14/01/1983
|align=left| Trebol, Santa Fe, Argentina
|align=left|
|-
|Win
|
|align=left| Jose Alberto Vega
|KO
|2
|10/12/1982
|align=left| Cordoba, Argentina
|align=left|
|-
|Win
|
|align=left| Reggie Ford
|KO
|1
|30/10/1982
|align=left| Sanremo, Italy
|align=left|
|-
|Win
|
|align=left| Juan Carlos Peralta
|PTS
|10
|08/10/1982
|align=left| San Francisco, Cordoba, Argentina
|align=left|
|-
|Win
|
|align=left| Jacinto Horacio Fernandez
|KO
|2
|11/09/1982
|align=left| Buenos Aire, Argentina
|align=left|
|-
|Win
|
|align=left| Obdulio Rogelio Zarza
|RTD
|6
|13/08/1982
|align=left| Corrientes, Argentina
|align=left|
|-
|Win
|
|align=left| Ricardo Arce
|KO
|2
|10/07/1982
|align=left| Buenos Aire, Argentina
|align=left|
|-
|Loss
|
|align=left| Ricardo Arce
|DQ
|3
|08/05/1982
|align=left| Buenos Aire, Argentina
|align=left|
|-
|Win
|
|align=left| Marcos Perez
|KO
|1
|16/04/1982
|align=left| Corrientes, Argentina
|align=left|
|-
|Win
|
|align=left| "Sugar" Ray Phillips
|KO
|1
|06/03/1982
|align=left| Buenos Aire, Argentina
|align=left|
|-
|Win
|
|align=left| Carlos Flores Burlon
|KO
|2
|12/02/1982
|align=left| Pergamino, Buenos Aires Province, Argentina
|align=left|
|-
|Win
|
|align=left| Juan Carlos Peralta
|PTS
|10
|22/01/1982
|align=left| Morteros, Argentina
|align=left|
|-
|Draw
|
|align=left| Jacinto Horacio Fernandez
|PTS
|10
|10/10/1981
|align=left| Buenos Aire, Argentina
|align=left|
|-
|Win
|
|align=left| Julio Cesar Arancibia
|KO
|2
|11/09/1981
|align=left| San Miguel de Tucuman, Argentina
|align=left|
|-
|Win
|
|align=left| Ricardo Molina Ortiz
|KO
|5
|24/07/1981
|align=left| San Miguel de Tucuman, Argentina
|align=left|
|-
|Win
|
|align=left| Jose Alberto Vega
|KO
|1
|10/07/1981
|align=left| San Francisco, Cordoba, Argentina
|align=left|
|-
|Win
|
|align=left| Obdulio Rogelio Zarza
|PTS
|10
|26/06/1981
|align=left| San Salvador de Jujuy, Argentina
|align=left|
|-
|Win
|
|align=left| Jose Maria Flores Burlon
|TKO
|3
|13/06/1981
|align=left| Buenos Aire, Argentina
|align=left|
|-
|Win
|
|align=left| Jacinto Horacio Fernandez
|PTS
|12
|13/03/1981
|align=left| San Francisco, Cordoba, Argentina
|align=left|
|-
|Win
|
|align=left|Manuel Navarro
|KO
|6
|13/02/1981
|align=left| Mar del Plata, Argentina
|align=left|
|-
|Win
|
|align=left| Marcos Perez
|PTS
|10
|16/01/1981
|align=left| Villa Carlos Paz, Argentina
|align=left|
|-
|Draw
|
|align=left| Juan Carlos Peralta
|PTS
|12
|19/12/1980
|align=left| Cordoba, Argentina
|align=left|
|-
|Win
|
|align=left| Jose Luis Duran
|KO
|6
|05/12/1980
|align=left| San Francisco, Cordoba, Argentina
|align=left|
|-
|Win
|
|align=left| Enrique Coronel
|KO
|7
|21/11/1980
|align=left| Salta, Argentina
|align=left|
|-
|Win
|
|align=left| Ramon Perez
|PTS
|12
|07/11/1980
|align=left| Cordoba, Argentina
|align=left|
|-
|Win
|
|align=left| Ricardo Molina Ortiz
|PTS
|10
|03/10/1980
|align=left| San Francisco, Cordoba, Argentina
|align=left|
|-
|Win
|
|align=left| Roberto Antonio Marziali
|KO
|1
|22/08/1980
|align=left| Las Varillas, Cordoba, Argentina
|align=left|
|-
|Win
|
|align=left| Obdulio Rogelio Zarza
|PTS
|10
|08/07/1980
|align=left| San Francisco, Cordoba, Argentina
|align=left|
|-
|Win
|
|align=left| Aldo Carmona
|KO
|3
|27/06/1980
|align=left| Salta, Argentina
|align=left|
|-
|Win
|
|align=left| Jorge Juan Salgado
|KO
|7
|06/06/1980
|align=left| San Francisco, Cordoba, Argentina
|align=left|
|-
|Win
|
|align=left| Ricardo Molina Ortiz
|PTS
|10
|16/05/1980
|align=left| San Francisco, Cordoba, Argentina
|align=left|
|-
|Win
|
|align=left| Ramon Perez
|KO
|8
|11/04/1980
|align=left| San Francisco, Cordoba, Argentina
|align=left|
|-
|Win
|
|align=left| Alfredo B Cruz
|KO
|7
|15/03/1980
|align=left| Buenos Aire, Argentina
|align=left|
|-
|Win
|
|align=left| Marcos Perez
|KO
|6
|22/02/1980
|align=left| Cordoba, Argentina
|align=left|
|-
|Win
|
|align=left| Juan Carlos Bogado
|PTS
|10
|08/02/1980
|align=left| San Francisco, Cordoba, Argentina
|align=left|
|-
|Win
|
|align=left| Roberto Troilo Ortiz
|KO
|2
|18/01/1980
|align=left| San Francisco, Cordoba, Argentina
|align=left|
|-
|Win
|
|align=left| Alfredo B Cruz
|RTD
|8
|22/12/1979
|align=left| Buenos Aires, Argentina
|align=left|
|-
|Loss
|
|align=left| Juan Carlos Bogado
|RTD
|8
|21/09/1979
|align=left| Cordoba, Argentina
|align=left|
|-
|Win
|
|align=left| Natalio O Ibarra
|TKO
|4
|07/09/1979
|align=left| Freyre, Cordoba, Argentina
|align=left|
|-
|Win
|
|align=left| Alberto R Cardozo
|KO
|3
|24/08/1979
|align=left| Morteros, Argentina
|align=left|
|-
|Win
|
|align=left| Ramon Perez
|PTS
|12
|10/08/1979
|align=left| San Francisco, Cordoba, Argentina
|align=left|
|-
|Win
|
|align=left| Alberto Juan Almiron
|RTD
|5
|20/07/1979
|align=left| Cordoba, Argentina
|align=left|
|-
|Win
|
|align=left| Oscar "The Grouch" Perez
|KO
|2
|29/06/1979
|align=left| Rafaela, Argentina
|align=left|
|-
|Win
|
|align=left| Hugo D Estefano Obregon
|RTD
|11
|08/06/1979
|align=left| San Francisco, Cordoba, Argentina
|align=left|
|-
|Win
|
|align=left| Natalio O Ibarra
|PTS
|10
|24/05/1979
|align=left| Brickman, Cordoba, Argentina
|align=left|
|-
|Win
|
|align=left| Hugo D Estefano Obregon
|PTS
|10
|11/05/1979
|align=left| Cordoba, Argentina
|align=left|
|-
|Win
|
|align=left| Oscar Francisco Lopez
|KO
|4
|20/04/1979
|align=left| Sunchales, Santa Fe, Argentina
|align=left|
|-
|Win
|
|align=left| Luis Carcacha
|RTD
|3
|06/04/1979
|align=left| San Francisco, Cordoba, Argentina
|align=left|
|-
|Win
|
|align=left| Irineo Claudio Cabrera
|KO
|1
|23/03/1979
|align=left| Rafaela, Santa Fe, Argentina
|align=left|
|-
|Win
|
|align=left| Luis Alberto Gutierrez
|KO
|1
|09/02/1979
|align=left| San Francisco, Cordoba, Argentina
|align=left|
|-
|Win
|
|align=left| Juan Carlos Hauscarriaga
|KO
|1
|26/01/1979
|align=left| Las Varillas, Cordoba, Argentina
|align=left|
|-
|Win
|
|align=left| Jorge Servin
|KO
|1
|08/12/1978
|align=left| San Francisco, Cordoba, Argentina
|align=left|
|}

References

External links
 

1957 births
2020 deaths
Roldan Juan
Argentine male boxers
Middleweight boxers
Deaths from the COVID-19 pandemic in Argentina